This article provides details of international football games played by the Cyprus national football team from 2010 to 2019.

The first match Cyprus played in the 2010s was a 0–0 draw against Iceland in a friendly match. The team completed five qualification campaigns between 2000 and 2009, two for the FIFA World Cup and three for the UEFA European Championship; they failed to qualify in each. They also participated in the inaugural UEFA Nations League, they were placed League C and finished in third place of Group 3. Between 2010 and 2019, the team played 77 matches and their record was 15 wins, 14 draws and 48 losses.

Matches

2010

2011

2012

2013

2014

2015

2016

2017

2018

2019

References

External links

Cyprus national football team results
2010s in Cypriot sport